Petersburg, North Carolina may refer to:
Petersburg, Burke County, North Carolina
Petersburg, Madison County, North Carolina
Petersburg, Onslow County, North Carolina
Moravian Falls, North Carolina, formerly called Petersburg